USS General W. C. Gorgas (ID-1365) was a United States Navy troop transport in commission in 1919, named for William C. Gorgas. It was a German ship seized by the US Shipping Board after the US entered World War I. Under charter from 1917 from the Panama Railroad Company, it had carried troops and supplies to Europe. After being used as a troop transport to return troops from Europe in 1919, later that year it was converted back to commercial use as a passenger and freight ship operated by the Panama Railroad Company.

In 1941, then owned by Libby, McNeill & Libby, it was chartered by the US War Department to carry troops on the West Coast between Seattle, Washington and ports in Alaska. In January 1945 it was transferred to the War Shipping Board, which later that year transferred the ship to the Soviet Union, an ally in the last years of the war. It was renamed as the SS Losomonov.

Construction and early career

General W. C. Gorgas was built in 1902 as the commercial passenger-cargo ship SS Prinz Sigismund at Rostock, Germany, by Neptun Aktiengesellschaft, Schiffswerft und Maschinenfabrik for the Hamburg-Amerika Line (HAL). HAL had five of these ships from three builders.

The United States Shipping Board seized Prinz Sigismund when the United States entered World War I on the side of the Allies in April 1917. It was renamed SS General W. C. Gorgas in honor of the man who directed sanitation measures to control mosquitoes and the diseases they carried during construction of the Panama Canal. She carried troops and cargo to Europe during the war under charter operations of the Panama Railroad Company of New York City, which operated connecting steamship lines before and after the Panama Canal was built. (This company had started at the time of construction of the Panama Railroad in the mid-19th century, to provide ship connections on both sides of the isthmus, to major cities of the East and West coasts.)

Her sisterships, Prinz Eitel Friedrich and Prinz Joachim, were also taken over in 1917 by the shipping board. They were renamed as Otsego (ID-1628) and Moccasin (ID-1322).

United States Navy career

After the war ended on 11 November 1918, the Shipping Board converted General W. C. Gorgas into a troop transport and transferred her to the U.S. Navy in March 1919 for postwar use in bringing American troops home from Europe. The Navy assigned her the naval registry Identification Number (Id. No.) 1365, and commissioned her on 8 March 1919 as USS General W. C. Gorgas.

Assigned to the Cruiser and Transport Force, General W. C. Gorgas departed New York City on 25 April 1919 for Bordeaux, France, where she embarked United States Army troops and loaded cargo. She returned to the United States, arriving at Philadelphia, Pennsylvania, on 2 June 1919. She again departed for Bordeaux on 5 June 1919, returning to the United States at Newport News, Virginia, on 4 July 1919. She brought home 2,063 troops from France in these two transatlantic voyages.

General W. C. Gorgas was decommissioned on 28 July 1919 and transferred the same day to the United States Shipping Board.

Later career

Again known as SS General W. C. Gorgas, the ship was returned to commercial service. It was first operated by the Panama Railroad and Shipping Company, through at least 1921.

Later the Gorgas was bought and operated by Libby, McNeill & Libby. In 1918 they had bought Otsego, the former Prinz Eitel Friedrich. They used both ships with success for supplying their fish cannery factories in Alaska. Both former German steamers stayed in commercial service on the West Coast until World War II.

In November 1941, the Gorgas was chartered by the United States Department of War for U.S. Army troop transport service between Seattle, Washington, and the Territory of Alaska as the United States Army Transport (USAT) General W. C. Gorgas. She continued her Army troopship duties to Alaska until transferred to the War Shipping Administration at Seattle in January 1945.

In 1945, the War Shipping Administration transferred General W. C. Gorgas to the Soviet Union, an ally during the war. She was renamed as SS Mikhail Lomonosov.

References

Department of the Navy: Naval Historical Center Online Library of Selected Images: Civilian Ships: S.S. General W.C. Gorgas (American Passenger-Cargo Steamer, 1902). Served as USS General W.C. Gorgas (ID # 1365) in 1919, and as USAT General W.C. Gorgas in 1941-1945
NavSource Online: Section Patrol Craft Photo Archive: General W. C. Gorgas (ID 1365)

Ships of the Hamburg America Line
Transports of the United States Navy
Transport ships of the United States Army
Ships built in Rostock
1902 ships